The Green Bay Packers Foundation is a charitable organization based in Green Bay, Wisconsin. Established in 1986, the Foundation's original purpose was to ensure continued charitable donations by the Green Bay Packers football team. Although it is legally a separate entity from the Packers, a Board of Trustees consisting of 10 members of the Green Bay Packers Board of Directors leads the Foundation. It receives most of its funding from the team. The Foundation provides grant opportunities to Wisconsin-based 501(c)(3) organizations for community improvement projects. , the Foundation has donated more than $11 million and maintains an endowment fund exceeding $40 million.

History
Judge Robert J. Parins, who was the president of the Green Bay Packers from 1982 to 1989, founded the Green Bay Packers Foundation in 1986. His desire was for the Foundation to be the charitable arm of the Packers organization and to ensure the team maintained strong community outreach. The Foundation has maintained a close relationship with the Packers organization since its founding.

Organization

The Packers Foundation is a 501(c)(3) organization headquartered at Lambeau Field in Green Bay, Wisconsin. It is led by a 10-person Board of Trustees drawn from the Green Bay Packers Board of Directors. The Trustees review the yearly grant applications  and decide how much money is to be provided to each applicant. Even though the Foundation is legally a separate entity and not part of the Green Bay Packers organization, it closely follows the goals of the Packers. It is the primary instrument the team uses for charitable giving.  This is reinforced by the fact the Green Bay Packers are the primary financial contributor to the Foundation. , the Foundation has amassed an endowment fund totaling over $40 million.

The Foundation also has a unique role if the Green Bay Packers are ever sold. The Packers are the only publicly owned team in the National Football League. Instead of a single owner, the organization is owned by over 537,000 shareholders who elect a Board of Directors and Executive Committee each year. If the shareholders were to decide to sell the team, the proceeds of the sale would not go to the shareholders. Instead, the Packer's bylaws state the proceeds would go to the Packers Foundation to fund charitable causes. The original bylaws stated the proceeds of any sale would be given to a local American Legion post to fund "a proper soldier's memorial". However, the shareholders voted to change the bylaws in 1997 to their current wording. , Forbes estimates the Packers are worth $2.63 billion.

Activities
The Foundation offers grant opportunities to Wisconsin-based charitable organizations to fund projects that further its mission. , the Foundation's mission is to assist local organizations which promote families, support athletic competitions, improve the welfare of Green Bay Packers players and fans, promote the education and safety of children, and reduce cruelty to animals. The grant opportunities are open to eligible organizations that apply during three-year cycles. Each year has a different focus area that falls under the Foundation's mission. In 2019, the Packers Foundation awarded $2.05 million worth of grants to various organizations that work in the areas of art, athletics, and education; this was the highest total awarded in a single year in the Foundation's history. The 2019 grant awards were not without controversy. One of the organizations that received funding from the Foundation was Planned Parenthood. Pro-life groups noted their disagreement with the grant funding and contrasted it with donations made by the Chicago Bears' charitable organization Bears Cares to the Chicago March for Life.

, the Foundation has provided over $12 million in grants since its formation.

References

Foundation
Charities based in Wisconsin